Expensive Soul are a Portuguese hip-hop duo formed in Leça da Palmeira in 1999, consisted of Demo as the group's MC and New Max as its singer, MC and producer. Expensive Soul's musical style incorporates various genres, ranging from  soul and reggae to R&B. 

In their live performances, the duo is joined by the Jaguar Band. The group has released their debut album B.I. in 2004, with which they rose to mainstream prominence. Some of their most famous songs have featured in Portuguese telenovelas,  such as the track "O Amor É Mágico" from their 2010 album Utopia. Other famous tracks include: "Dou te Nada" (2010) and "Cúpido" (2013).

Formation and early years
Tiago Novo and António Conde attended the same class in their high school in Leça da Palmeira, Matosinhos. The duo started their project Expensive Soul in 1999 adopting, in the process, the artistic names New Max and Demo. Their debut album B.I., released in 2004, featured the single "Eu Não Sei", which appeared in the popular teen telenovela Morangos com Açúcar. The track's success allowed the band to become known to the general public.

In their live performances, the duo is accompanied by the instrumental ensemble Jaguar Band; New Max has been described as the most reserved half of the duo, whereas Demo has been noted to exude a "natural magnetism" and a more energetic approach to their shows.

Discography

Albums
 B.I. (CD, 2004)
 Alma Cara (CD, 2006)
 Utopia (CD, 2010)
 Sonhador (CD, 2014)

Live albums
 Ao Vivo Nos Coliseus (2016)

DVDs
 Expensive Soul Symphonic Experience (DVD, 2012)

References

External links
 Official website

Portuguese hip hop groups